Jean Rouaud (born 13 December 1952) is a French author, who was born in Campbon, Loire-Atlantique. In 1990 his novel Fields of Glory (French: Les Champs d'honneur) won the Prix Goncourt. First believed to be the first book in a trilogy, Fields of Glory turned out to be the first book in a series of five books on the family history of the author.

English bibliography

La femme promise. 2008.

References

External links
http://www.jean-rouaud.com

1952 births
Living people
People from Loire-Atlantique
20th-century French novelists
21st-century French novelists
Prix Goncourt winners
French male novelists
20th-century French male writers
21st-century French male writers